Curt Smith (born March 20, 1951 in Caledonia, New York) is an American author, media host and columnist. In addition to work as a newspaper reporter, Smith was a political speechwriter until 1992 and a host of radio and television programs until 2002. He has written 17 books, including Voices of the Game, which covers the history of baseball broadcasting. Smith is a newspaper columnist in upstate New York and holds an academic appointment at the University of Rochester.

Biography
Smith is a 1973 graduate of State University of New York at Geneseo. He worked as a Gannett Company reporter, a speechwriter to former Texas Governor John Connolly, and an editor at the Saturday Evening Post. In 1989 he joined the George H. W. Bush Administration as a speechwriter. After Bush’s defeat in 1992 Smith lectured at the Smithsonian Institution and then turned to radio and television. From 1994 to 1996 he hosted the Midday Milwaukee talk show on radio station WISN. He also hosted WROC-TV’s Perfectly Clear program from 2000 to 2002 and a 1997-2002 series on the Fox Empire Sports Network.

Currently Smith hosts the weekly Perspectives series on Rochester, New York’s NPR affiliate WXXI. The show deals with politics, pop culture, sports, and other topics. Smith also hosts the twice-weekly Talking Point show on Rochester’s CBS affiliate WROC, where he spars with co-hosts on political and other issues.

Smith is the author of eleven books: Voices of Summer, What Baseball Means to Me, Voices of The Game, Storied Stadiums, Windows on the White House, Our House, Of Mikes and Men, Long Time Gone, A Fine Sense of the Ridiculous, America's Dizzy Dean and The Storytellers. Perhaps his best known book is Voices of The Game, which recounts the history of baseball broadcasting from KDKA’s first Pittsburgh Pirates broadcast in 1921 to today’s enormous media coverage of the game. A three-part documentary was also made based on the book and has aired on ESPN. His writing style has been highly praised by pundits like Bob Costas, but he has also been criticized for overly florid and sometimes tangled prose.

Smith lives in Rochester with his wife Sarah and their two children. He writes columns for the Messenger-Post newspapers in upstate New York and is a senior lecturer at the University of Rochester.

References

External links
Curt Smith web site

1951 births
Living people
American columnists
American speechwriters
American talk radio hosts
Baseball writers
Journalists from New York (state)
People from Caledonia, New York
Speechwriters for presidents of the United States
State University of New York at Geneseo alumni
University of Rochester faculty
Writers from Rochester, New York